Carl Axel ("Acke") Henrik Petri (12 August 1929 – 3 December 2017) was a Swedish politician and judge. Petri studied law and assumed the chief judgeship in the Administrative Court of Appeal in Jönköping in 1976, then stepped down to become chief justice on the Göta Court of Appeal in 1987, on which he served until 1996. Petri was a cabinet member under prime minister Thorbjörn Fälldin from 1979 to 1982, leading the Ministry of Energy until 1981, when he was named Minister for Justice.

Early life
Petri was born on 12 August 1929 at Djupadals House in Ronneby Municipality, Sweden, the son of consul Carl Petri and his wife Maud (née Wrede). Petri grew up in Växjö where he also passed studentexamen. He received a Candidate of Law degree from Lund University in 1953.>

Career
Petri did his clerkship from 1953 to 1955 and worked as an extra legal clerk (fiskal) in the Scania and Blekinge Court of Appeal in 1956. He then served in different parliamentary committees in the Riksdag from 1958 to 1961 and worked as an assessor in the Scania and Blekinge Court of Appeal in 1963 and as an insurance judge (försäkringsdomare) in 1964. Petri was lawspeaker in the Administrative Court of Stockholm from 1972 to 1976, president of the Administrative Court of Appeal in Jönköping from 1976 to 1987 and minister without portfolio with responsibility for energy issues, among other things from 1979 to 1981. He then served as cabinet minister and Minister for Justice and head of the Ministry of Justice from 1981 to 1982 and president of Göta Court of Appeal from 1987 to 1996.

Petri was secretary and member of various government inquiries. He was chairman of the Utlänningslagkommittén ("Aliens Law Committee"), Miljöskyddsutredningen ("Environmental Protection Inquiry"), Allmänna advokatbyråkommittén ("General Law Firm Committee"), Sjömanspensionsutredningen ("Seamen's Pension Inquiry"), Kyrkoförfattningsutredningen ("Church Constitution Inquiry"), Data- och offentlighetskommittén ("Data and Publicity Committee"), Skeppslegoutredningen ("Ship Lease Inquiry"), Utredningen om ekonomisk och rätt i kyrkan ("Inquiry into Economic and Legal Rights in the Church"), Fri- och rättighetsutredningen ("Freedom and Rights Inquiry"), Kyrkoberedningen and Miljöbalksutredningen ("Environmental Code Inquiry"). He was a board member of the National Swedish Environment Protection Board (Statens Naturvårdsverk) from 1971 to 1976, chairman of the Stockholm County Council Legal Aid Board (Rättshjälpsnämnden i Stockholm) from 1974 to 1976, first vice chairman of the Swedish Society of Jurists and Sociologists (Jurist- och Samhällsvetareförbundet) from 1975 to 1977, chairman of Board of Appeal for Legal Assistance (Besvärsnämnden för rättshjälp) from 1988 to 1990, of Stamnätsnämnden from 1987, vice chairman of the board of Svenska kraftnät from 1992, board member of Sparbanken Alfa from 1987 to 1991, chairman of the Alfa Savings Bank Foundation (Sparbanksstiftelsen Alfa) from 1991, and chairman of the Sparbanksstiftelsernas Förvaltnings AB from 1994.

Personal life
In 1953, Petri married Brita Thulin (born 1931), the daughter of Walther Thulin and Margareta (née Pettersson).

Death
Petri died on 3 December 2017 in Jönköping. The funeral service took place in Sofia Church in Jönköping on 18 December 2017.

Honours
Honorary doctor of Jönköping University (2002)

Bibliography

References

1929 births
2017 deaths
Swedish Ministers for Justice
People from Ronneby Municipality
20th-century Swedish judges
Lund University alumni